Norman House on Steep Hill, Lincoln, England is an historic building and an example of  Norman domestic architecture.

The building is at 46–47 Steep Hill and 7 Christ's Hospital Terrace. The architectural evidence suggests a date between 1170 and 1180.

The building was known for many years as "Aaron the Jew's House", and appears as such in many references, as it was thought to be the former residence of Aaron of Lincoln (c.1125–1186), although this is now considered incorrect.

The building has been a shop for many years, and is currently home to a tea importers.

It has been designated a Grade I listed building by English Heritage.

See also
Jew's House
Jew's Court
John of Gaunt’s Palace, Lincoln
St. Mary's Guildhall, Lincoln

References

External links

The present tenant

Buildings and structures completed in 1180
History of Lincolnshire
Norman architecture in England
Buildings and structures in Lincoln, England
Grade I listed buildings in Lincolnshire
Grade I listed houses